Tselennikovo is a rural locality (a village) in Vokhtozhskoye Rural Settlement, Gryazovetsky District, Vologda Oblast, Russia. The population was 32 as of 2002.

Geography 
Tselennikovo is located 65 km east of Gryazovets (the district's administrative centre) by road. Koryuchevo is the nearest rural locality.

References 

Rural localities in Gryazovetsky District